is a Japanese manga artist. He is best known as the creator of Lucifer and the Biscuit Hammer, Spirit Circle, and the anime television series Planet With.

Biography 
Mizukami was born in Osaka on February 20, 1980. He decided to become a manga artist at a young age and began drawing manga while in middle school. During this time, he was influenced by the anime Mashin Hero Wataru, the manga Ghost Sweeper Mikami, and light novels such as Slayers. Later influences include Gainax works, particularly FLCL. Mizukami graduated from the Osaka Technical School of Integrative Design's Department of Manga. In 2004, during the serialization of Angel Onayami Sōdanjo, he moved to the Kanto region and established a workplace in Funabashi, Chiba Prefecture where he currently resides. Mizukami often depicts himself as a frog or wearing a frog mask.

Works

Manga

Anime

References 

Manga artists from Osaka Prefecture
People from Osaka
1980 births
Living people